WETF may refer to:

 WisdomTree Investments (NASDAQ: WETF), a New York-based finance company
 Weightless Environment Training Facility, a neutral buoyancy facility at NASA's Johnson Space Center
 World Egg Throwing Federation, a UK organization that promotes the sport of egg throwing
 WETF-LP, a low-power radio station (105.7 FM) licensed to serve South Bend, Indiana, United States